Stepenitztal is a municipality in the Nordwestmecklenburg district, in Mecklenburg-Vorpommern, Germany. It takes its name from the river Stepenitz. It was formed on 25 May 2014 by the merger of the former municipalities Börzow, Mallentin and Papenhusen.

References

Nordwestmecklenburg